Hooked on a Feeling is an album by Swedish Rock band Blue Swede released in 1974. They became known internationally recognized largely due to their 'ooga chaka' cover of Jonathan King's 1971 version of the 1968 Mark James song "Hooked on a Feeling".

Track listing

Personnel
Blue Swede
 Björn Skifs - lead vocals
 Michael Areklaw - guitars
 Bosse Liljedahl - bass
 Ladislav Balatz - electric piano, organ
 Hinke Ekestubbe - tenor saxophone, backing vocals, flute
 Tom Berger - trumpet, backing vocals, flugelhorn
 Jan Guldbäch - drums

References 

1974 albums
Blue Swede albums
EMI Records albums